The original face is a term in Zen Buddhism, pointing to the nonduality of subject and object.

Origins
The phrase "original face" originates in Huangpo's Chuanhsin fayao (857) and the Hui-sin edition (967) of the Platform Sutra:

This question appears in case 23 of the Mumonkan:

This koan is transformed in the question

Interpretation
The "original face" points to "the nonduality of subject and object":

Comparable statements are: "Look at the flower and the flower also looks"; "Guest and host interchange".

It is not "pure consciousness", as it is often understood in western thinking, reached by "cleaning the doors of perception":

Comments
Zen masters have commented on the original face:

{{blockquote|"Sweep away thoughts!" means one must do zazen.  Once thoughts are quieted, the Original Face appears.  Thoughts can be compared to clouds.  When clouds vanish, the moon appears.  The moon of suchness is the Original Face.  Thoughts are also like the fogging of a mirror.  When you wipe away all condensation, a mirror reflects clearly.  Quiet your thoughts and behold your Original Face before you were born!|author=Daito}}

Artistic impressions

Philip Whalen
The American poet Philip Whalen has written a poem, Metaphysical Insomnia Jazz Mumonkan xxix'', inspired by the Original Face-koan:

                                                                                               
Keith Kumasen has commented on this poem.

Stuart Davis
The American Buddhist musician Stuart Davis has recorded a song called "Original Face". The chorus goes:

See also
 the Five Ranks of Tozan

Notes

References

Sources

External links
 TriCycle, Green Koans case 12: Original Face"

Zen Buddhist philosophical concepts
Kōan